"Gotta Have You" is a 1991 song by American rhythm and blues singer Stevie Wonder. The song was the first release from the 1991 soundtrack to the film Jungle Fever. Wonder wrote the song, and co-produced it with Nathan Watts.The song peaked at No. 3 in the Hot R&B/ Hip Hop chart, making it one of Wonder's very few Top 10s of the 90s.

Content and reception
James E. Perone wrote in The Sound of Stevie Wonder: His Words and Music that "it anticipates the regularly 6-minutes-plus songs of his next album, Conversation Peace" and that it "is not one of Wonder's best-remembered compositions and recordings, but it does feature a fine funky, blues-infused lead vocal melody in the verses".

In a review of the album, Stephen Thomas Erlewine of Allmusic wrote that "While the keyboard funk of 'Chemical Love,' 'Gotta Have You,' and 'Queen in the Black' doesn't sound new, it does sound alive, which is better than Wonder has sounded in years." A review in Musician was less favorable, calling it "generic, repetitive 70s-style funk".

B-side
The B-side, Feeding off the Love of the Land which featured in the films end credits was written during the Fulfillingness First Finale sessions but was shelved. It was updated with strings before its release.

Track listing
Per Discogs.

"Gotta Have You (Radio Edit)" - 4:30
"Gotta Have You (Album Version)" - 6:26
"Gotta Have You (Instrumental)" - 4:48
"Feeding Off the Love of the Land" - 5:55

Chart performance

References

1991 singles
1991 songs
Stevie Wonder songs
Songs written by Stevie Wonder
Motown singles
Song recordings produced by Stevie Wonder